Rella may refer to:

 Rella, Bell County, Kentucky
 "Rella" (song), a song on Odd Future's 2012 album The OF Tape Vol. 2
 Rella Braithwaite (born 1923), Canadian author